Elections to Liverpool City Council were held on Friday 1 November 1901.

There were three new seats : Anfield, Walton and Warbreck.

Eight of the thirty seats were uncontested.

After the election, the composition of the council was:

Election result

Ward results

* - Retiring Councillor seeking re-election

Comparisons are made with the 1898 election results, as the retiring councillors were elected in that year.

Abercromby

Anfield

Breckfield

Brunswick

Castle Street

{{Election box candidate with party link|
  |party      = Conservative Party (UK)
  |candidate  = Thomas Binley Neale *
  |votes      = 575
  |percentage = ''71%  |change     = 
}}

Dingle

Edge Hill

Everton

Exchange

Fairfield

Granby

Great George

Kensington

Kirkdale

Low Hill

Netherfield

North Scotland

Prince's Park

Sandhills

St. Anne's

St. Domingo

St. Peter's

Sefton Park East

Sefton Park West

South Scotland

Vauxhall

Walton

Warbreck

Wavertree

West Derby

Aldermanic elections

At the meeting of the Council on 9 November 1901, the terms of office of fifteen alderman expired.

The following fifteen were elected as Aldermen by the Council (Aldermen and Councillors) on 9 November 1901 for a term of six years.*''' - re-elected aldermen.

By-elections

No. 13 North Scotland, 28 May 1902

Following the death of Alderman John Houlding (Conservative), Councillor Dr. Alexander Murray Bligh (Irish Nationalist, North Scotland ward, elected 1 November 1899) was elected by the Council (Aldermen and Councillors) as an Alderman on 7 May 1902
.

The term of office to expire on 1 November 1902.

No.16 Exchange, 17 June 1902

Caused by the resignation of Councillor Edmond Brownbill (Liberal, Exchange, elected 1 November 1899), which was reported to the Council on 4 June 1902.

The term of office to expire on 1 November 1902.

No.25 Brunswick, 15 July 1902

Caused by the resignation of Councillor Charles Henry Beloe (Liberal, Brunswick, elected 1 November 1901), which was reported to the Council on 2 July 1902.

No. 15 Vauxhall, 21 August 1902

Caused by the resignation of Councillor Thomas Burke (Irish Nationalist, elected 1 November 1900), which was reported to the Council on 6 August 1902.

The term of office to expire on 1 November 1903.

No. 19. St Peter's, August 1902

Caused by the death of Councillor Samuel Hough (Liberal, St. Peter's, elected 1 November 1899) on 12 August 1902.

See also

 Liverpool City Council
 Liverpool Town Council elections 1835 - 1879
 Liverpool City Council elections 1880–present
 Mayors and Lord Mayors of Liverpool 1207 to present
 History of local government in England

References

1901
Liverpool
November 1901 events
1900s in Liverpool